Lisa Anne Herbold (born June 14, 1967) is an American politician. She serves on the Seattle City Council representing the 1st District, which covers part of West Seattle. She was first elected in 2015 after narrowly defeating Shannon Braddock, and was sworn into office on January 4, 2016. She was reelected in November 2019.

Herbold has decades of political experience at city hall. As a longtime advocate for services for people experiencing homelessness, Herbold had been targeted by political opponents. In October 2019, Herbold contacted Seattle's chief of police to report what she thought was an RV stolen and parked in front of her home as a prank in West Seattle, which belonged to a homeless couple. She was not seeking the removal of the RV. She subsequently acknowledged that she had violated the council's ethics code by contacting a department head directly and paid a $500 fine to the Seattle Ethics and Elections Commission. She stated that she believed the RV was stolen and had been parked in front of her home as a political stunt.

Electoral history

2015 election

2019 election

Personal life
Herbold has a daughter, a grand-daughter, a grandson, and two step-daughters.

References

External links 
 Webpage on Seattle City Council website

Living people
Seattle City Council members
Women city councillors in Washington (state)
21st-century American politicians
21st-century American women politicians
Syracuse University alumni
1967 births